Bronów may refer to:

Bronów, Góra County in Lower Silesian Voivodeship (south-west Poland)
Bronów, Silesian Voivodeship (south Poland)
Bronów, Świdnica County in Lower Silesian Voivodeship (south-west Poland)
Bronów, Opoczno County in Łódź Voivodeship (central Poland)
Bronów, Poddębice County in Łódź Voivodeship (central Poland)
Bronów, Świętokrzyskie Voivodeship (south-central Poland)
Bronów, Greater Poland Voivodeship (west-central Poland)